The Campeonato Mineiro de Futebol de 2015 - Módulo I (also known as the Mineiro UNICEF 2015) was the 101st edition of  the Campeonato Mineiro, Minas Gerais's top professional football league. The season started on 1 February 2015 and concluded on 3 May 2015.

A total of 12 teams competed in the league: 8 sides from the 2014 season and two promoted from the 2014 Módulo II. Cruzeiro were the defending champions. On 3 May 2015, Atlético Mineiro were crowned champions for the 43rd time.

Format

First stage 
The 2015 Módulo I first stage was played by 12 clubs in single round-robin, with all teams playing each other once. The four best-placed teams qualified for the final stage and the last two teams were relegated to the 2016 Módulo II.

The league also selected Minas Gerais's representatives in the Campeonato Brasileiro Série D and the Copa do Brasil. The two best placed teams not already qualified to the 2015 seasons of the Série A, Série B or Série C, earned the spots to the 2015 Série D. The three best placed teams qualified to the 2016 Copa do Brasil.

Knockout stage 
The knockout stage was played between the 4 best placed teams from the previous stage, with semifinals and finals played in a two-legged tie. The best placed team in the first stage in each contest had the right to choose whether to play its home game in the first or second leg. The best placed team in the first stage in each contest could win it with two ties.

Teams

First stage

Knockout stage

Semifinals

First leg

Second leg

Finals

Bracket

General table

Top goalscorers
As of match played on 3 May 2015.

References

External links 
 Official website at Federação Mineira de Futebol

Campeonato Mineiro seasons
2015 in Brazilian football
Mineiro